Spencer William Fisher (born May 9, 1976) is a retired American mixed martial artist. A professional competitor from 2002–2012, he is best known for his 17-fight tenure with the UFC, winning "Fight of the Night" honors three times.

Background
Fisher was born in Cashiers, North Carolina. He played soccer while growing up, and was also a fan of professional wrestling. Fisher was introduced to martial arts, when he began practicing Shotokan Karate and Jeet Kun Do at a young age in his school's cafeteria. Fisher then transitioned to boxing in 1992 and began training for MMA soon after. Before becoming a professional fighter, he worked in landscaping and security.

Mixed martial arts career

Early career
Fisher made his professional mixed martial arts debut in 2002 and compiled a record of 14–1 before being signed by the UFC.

Ultimate Fighting Championship
He made his UFC debut at Ultimate Fight Night 2, scoring a second-round submission victory over Thiago Alves. He then defeated Aaron Riley at Ultimate Fight Night 3 by TKO due to a doctor stoppage after the first round after Fisher broke Riley's Jaw with strikes. Perhaps Fisher's most notable early fight was with Canadian kickboxer Sam Stout on the undercard of UFC 58. When Stout's original opponent Kenny Florian sustained an injury in training that left him unable to compete, Fisher took the fight on very late notice, reportedly having to cut twenty pounds in the final two days leading up to the match. Although Fisher seemed to land the harder punches, Stout landed more and came away with a controversial split decision.

Fisher returned at UFC 60 against Matt Wiman and won by knockout in the second round, knocking Wiman out with a flying knee. Fisher was able to record another first round TKO at UFC 64 against Dan Lauzon. His win streak came to a halt at Ultimate Fight Night 8, after a back and forth fight Fisher was defeated in the second round by TKO due to punches by Hermes Franca. The bout won the "Fight of the Night" award.

In a highly anticipated rematch, Fisher defeated Sam Stout at Fight Night 10 by unanimous decision after three rounds. This rematch with Stout propelled Fisher into the spotlight, as it was the main event, it won Fight of the Night and because both fighters took massive amounts of punishment throughout the fight. It has also been named as one of the UFC's 100 Greatest Fights. Fisher was scheduled to fight Din Thomas at UFC Fight Night 11, but was forced to withdraw due to a staph infection. Ironically, Fisher's replacement for this match was Kenny Florian, whom Fisher had replaced in the UFC 58 fight against Sam Stout.

Fisher fought Frankie Edgar at UFC 78 on November 17, 2007. Fisher lost the fight by unanimous decision. Fisher's next fight was scheduled to be against Marcus Aurélio at UFC Fight Night 13, but he was forced to withdraw due to a shoulder injury. With his shoulder healed, Fisher was next scheduled to fight young up and comer Jeremy Stephens at The Ultimate Fighter: Team Rampage vs. Team Forrest Finale on June 21, 2008. Fisher dominated Stephens and won by unanimous decision.

Fisher defeated Shannon Gugerty by submission due to a triangle choke at UFC 90 in Chicago on October 25, 2008.

Fisher won his fight at UFC 99 via unanimous decision defeating veteran Caol Uno. Fisher lost to Joe Stevenson at UFC 104 by submission (elbow strikes) in the second round.

Fisher was scheduled to face vicious striker Duane Ludwig on March 21, 2010 at UFC LIVE: Vera vs. Jones, but Fisher was forced off the card with an injury.  Ludwig faced UFC newcomer Darren Elkins instead.

Fisher faced Dennis Siver on June 19, 2010 at The Ultimate Fighter: Team Liddell vs. Team Ortiz Finale. He lost the fight via unanimous decision.

Fisher's next fight was against UFC newcomer Curt Warburton on October 16, 2010 at UFC 120. He won the fight via unanimous decision.

Fisher faced Ross Pearson on February 27, 2011 at UFC 127.  He lost the fight via unanimous decision.

Fisher then faced Thiago Tavares on August 27, 2011 at UFC 134. He lost via TKO at 2:51 of round 2.

Fisher faced Sam Stout for the third time on June 22, 2012 at UFC on FX 4. He lost the fight via unanimous decision.  Both participants earned Fight of the Night honors for their performances.

Following his loss to Stout, Fisher announced he would be retiring from MMA.

Fisher decided against retirement and was expected to face Yves Edwards on July 27, 2013 at UFC on Fox 8.  However, on July 11, Fisher was removed from the bout due to injury and replaced by Daron Cruickshank. It was later revealed that Fisher was suffering from chronic traumatic encephalopathy, which was likely a direct result of multiple concussive head injuries sustained from his career as a mixed martial artist. Neurological doctors examining Fisher identified that he was unable to hop on one foot, and was incapable of tandem walking. He was advised to retire from fighting immediately.

Fisher was rendered unable to perform basic daily tasks as a result of the traumatic brain injuries that he had sustained, and suffered from headaches, forgetfulness, depression and extreme dizzy spells on a daily basis following his retirement. He and his family considered taking legal action against the UFC on the basis that his injuries were likely a direct result of his career with the organization, but elected not to do so. The UFC continued to pay him $5,000 per month until April 2017, at which point it was decided that his independent contractor agreement with the company was not to be renewed due to a planned reduction of business expenses following the Company's recent $4 billion takeover. Fisher's wife Emily was forced to leave full-time employment to care for him, and Fisher now relies on coaching MMA classes in a local gym.

The issues faced by Fisher in living with his injuries following retirement gained increased attention in January 2021, following the release of an article about Fisher by the website MMA Fighting. UFC President Dana White, when responding to questions regarding Fisher's condition ahead of UFC Fight Island 7, stated that "he’s not the first and he’s definitely not going to be the last (to suffer neurological injuries as a result of a career in combat sports). This is a contact sport and anybody who’s done this younger, myself included, is dealing with brain issues. It’s part of the gig." Welterweight fighter Matt Brown, responding to the article in question, also stated that he had suffered similar symptoms throughout his career, and acknowledged that this was a real risk faced by fighters who take considerable damage during their careers.

Personal life
Fisher is married to female former mixed martial arts fighter Emily Fisher. The couple has three daughters.

Fisher owns and operates Glory Martial Arts Fitness, a gym in Sylva, North Carolina.

Mixed martial arts record

|-
| Loss
| align=center| 24–9
| Sam Stout
| Decision (unanimous)
| UFC on FX: Maynard vs. Guida
| 
| align=center| 3
| align=center| 5:00
| Atlantic City, New Jersey, United States
| 
|-
| Loss
| align=center| 24–8
| Thiago Tavares
| TKO (punches)
| UFC 134
| 
| align=center| 2
| align=center| 2:51
| Rio de Janeiro, Brazil
| 
|-
| Loss
| align=center| 24–7
| Ross Pearson
| Decision (unanimous)
| UFC 127
| 
| align=center| 3
| align=center| 5:00
| Sydney, Australia
| 
|-
| Win
| align=center| 24–6
| Curt Warburton
| Decision (unanimous)
| UFC 120
| 
| align=center| 3
| align=center| 5:00
| London, England
| 
|-
| Loss
| align=center| 23–6
| Dennis Siver
| Decision (unanimous)
| The Ultimate Fighter 11 Finale
| 
| align=center| 3
| align=center| 5:00
| Las Vegas, Nevada, United States
| 
|-
| Loss
| align=center| 23–5
| Joe Stevenson
| TKO (submission to elbows)
| UFC 104
| 
| align=center| 2
| align=center| 4:03
| Los Angeles, California, United States
| 
|-
| Win
| align=center| 23–4
| Caol Uno
| Decision (unanimous)
| UFC 99
| 
| align=center| 3
| align=center| 5:00
| Cologne, Germany
| 
|-
| Win
| align=center| 22–4
| Shannon Gugerty
| Submission (triangle choke)
| UFC 90
| 
| align=center| 3
| align=center| 3:56
| Rosemont, Illinois, United States
| 
|-
| Win
| align=center| 21–4
| Jeremy Stephens
| Decision (unanimous)
| The Ultimate Fighter: Team Rampage vs Team Forrest Finale
| 
| align=center| 3
| align=center| 5:00
| Las Vegas, Nevada, United States
| 
|-
| Loss
| align=center| 20–4
| Frankie Edgar
| Decision (unanimous)
| UFC 78
| 
| align=center| 3
| align=center| 5:00
| Newark, New Jersey, United States
| 
|-
| Win
| align=center| 20–3
| Sam Stout
| Decision (unanimous)
| UFC Fight Night: Stout vs. Fisher
| 
| align=center| 3
| align=center| 5:00
| Hollywood, Florida, United States
| 
|-
| Loss
| align=center| 19–3
| Hermes Franca
| TKO (punches)
| UFC Fight Night: Evans vs. Salmon
| 
| align=center| 2
| align=center| 4:03
| Hollywood, Florida, United States
| 
|-
| Win
| align=center| 19–2
| Dan Lauzon
| TKO (punches)
| UFC 64: Unstoppable
| 
| align=center| 1
| align=center| 4:38
| Las Vegas, Nevada, United States
| 
|-
| Win
| align=center| 18–2
| Matt Wiman
| KO (flying knee)
| UFC 60: Hughes vs. Gracie
| 
| align=center| 2
| align=center| 1:43
| Los Angeles, California, United States
| 
|-
| Loss
| align=center| 17–2
| Sam Stout
| Decision (split)
| UFC 58: USA vs. Canada
| 
| align=center| 3
| align=center| 5:00
| Las Vegas, Nevada, United States
| 
|-
| Win
| align=center| 17–1
| Randy Hauer
| Submission (triangle choke)
| Battle at the Boardwalk (Day 1)
| 
| align=center| 1
| align=center| 4:18
| Atlantic City, New Jersey, United States
| 
|-
| Win
| align=center| 16–1
| Aaron Riley
| TKO (doctor stoppage)
| UFC Fight Night 3
| 
| align=center| 1
| align=center| 5:00
| Las Vegas, Nevada, United States
| 
|-
| Win
| align=center| 15–1
| Thiago Alves
| Submission (triangle choke)
| UFC Ultimate Fight Night 2
| 
| align=center| 2
| align=center| 4:43
| Las Vegas, Nevada, United States
| 
|-
| Win
| align=center| 14–1
| Henry Matamoros
| TKO (punches)
| SuperBrawl 40
| 
| align=center| 1
| align=center| 2:48
| Hammond, Indiana, United States
| 
|-
| Win
| align=center| 13–1
| Kyle Watson
| KO (punch)
| Courage Fighting Championships 2
| 
| align=center| 1
| align=center| 0:33
| Decatur, Illinois, United States
| 
|-
| Win
| align=center| 12–1
| Tim Means
| Submission (triangle choke)
| IFC: Eve Of Destruction
| 
| align=center| 1
| align=center| 1:44
| Salt Lake City, Utah, United States
| 
|-
| Win
| align=center| 11–1
| John Strawn
| Submission (triangle choke)
| VFC 8: Fallout
| 
| align=center| 2
| align=center| 3:32
| Council Bluffs, Iowa, United States
| 
|-
| Win
| align=center| 10–1
| Shawn McCully
| KO (punches)
| Xtreme Kage Kombat
| 
| align=center| 1
| align=center| 1:42
| Des Moines, Iowa, United States
| 
|-
| Loss
| align=center| 9–1
| Carlo Prater
| Decision (unanimous)
| Freestyle Fighting Championships 9
| 
| align=center| 3
| align=center| 5:00
| Biloxi, Mississippi, United States
| 
|-
| Win
| align=center| 9–0
| Josh Neer
| Decision (split)
| VFC 7: Showdown
| 
| align=center| 5
| align=center| 5:00
| Council Bluffs, Iowa, United States
| 
|-
| Win
| align=center| 8–0
| Eddy Ellis
| Submission (armbar)
| IFC: Battleground Tahoe
| 
| align=center| 2
| align=center| 3:10
| Lake Tahoe, Nevada, United States
| 
|-
| Win
| align=center| 7–0
| Daryl Guthmiller
| Submission (armbar)
| ICC 2: Rebellion
| 
| align=center| 2
| align=center| 2:45
| Minneapolis, Minnesota, United States
| 
|-
| Win
| align=center| 6–0
| Kurt Illeman
| KO (punch)
| Extreme Challenge 49
| 
| align=center| 1
| align=center| 1:42
| Davenport, Iowa, United States
| 
|-
| Win
| align=center| 5–0
| Jonathan Spears
| TKO (punches)
| Tuesday Night Fights
| 
| align=center| 1
| align=center| 1:02
| Davenport, Iowa, United States
| 
|-
| Win
| align=center| 4–0
| Adam Copenhaver
| TKO (punches)
| VFC 3: Total Chaos
| 
| align=center| 1
| align=center| 3:54
| Council Bluffs, Iowa, United States
| 
|-
| Win
| align=center| 3–0
| Tim Palmer
| TKO (punches)
| VFC 3: Total Chaos
| 
| align=center| 1
| align=center| 0:57
| Council Bluffs, Iowa, United States
| 
|-
| Win
| align=center| 2–0
| Dave Gries
| Submission (rear-naked choke)
| VFC 3: Total Chaos
| 
| align=center| 1
| align=center| 4:28
| Council Bluffs, Iowa, United States
| 
|-
| Win
| align=center| 1–0
| Ryan Heckert
| Submission (armbar)
| VFC 2: Bragging Rights
| 
| align=center| 1
| align=center| 2:54
| Council Bluffs, Iowa, United States
|

See also
 List of current UFC fighters
 List of male mixed martial artists

References

External links
Official Website

1976 births
Living people
American male mixed martial artists
Mixed martial artists from North Carolina
Lightweight mixed martial artists
Mixed martial artists utilizing Jeet Kune Do
Mixed martial artists utilizing Shotokan
Mixed martial artists utilizing boxing
Ultimate Fighting Championship male fighters
American Jeet Kune Do practitioners
American male karateka